The Skalica Culture House (Slovak: Skalický kultúrny dom) is a Secession building in Skalica built in 1905 by Slovak architect Dušan Jurkovič.

History
Idea of Skalica Culture House was presented by Slovak politician Pavel Blaho. Architect was Dušan Jurkovič who gain inspiration from Slovak and Moravian folk architecture. Building was open to the public in 1905.

References

Art Nouveau architecture in Slovakia
20th-century architecture in Slovakia
Event venues in Slovakia
Buildings and structures in Trnava Region